The 2017 Oregon Ducks football team represented the University of Oregon during the 2017 NCAA Division I FBS football season. The team was led by first-year head coach Willie Taggart, until he departed at the end of the regular season to accept the head coaching position at Florida State. Co-Offensive Coordinator Mario Cristobal was promoted to interim head coach before being officially hired as head coach on December 8, 2017. Oregon played their home games at Autzen Stadium for the 51st straight year. They competed as a member of the Pac-12 Conference in the North Division. They finished the season 7–6, 4–5 in Pac-12 play to finish in fourth place in the North Division. They were invited to the Las Vegas Bowl where they lost to Boise State.

Previous season
They finished the season 4–8, 2–7 in Pac-12 play to finish in last place in the North Division. On November 29, Coach Mark Helfrich was fired. He finished at Oregon with a four-year record of 37–16.

Recruiting

Position key

Recruits

Oregon signed a total of 24 recruits.

Personnel

Schedule

Source:

Personnel

Rankings

Game summaries

Southern Utah

Nebraska

Wyoming

Arizona State

California

Washington State

Stanford

UCLA

Utah

Washington

Arizona

Oregon State

Las Vegas Bowl

References

Oregon
Oregon Ducks football seasons
Oregon Ducks football